Timothy Alan Friese-Greene is an English musician and producer. He worked with the band Talk Talk from 1983 to their breakup in 1991. He currently releases solo albums under the name "Heligoland". He is the grandson of filmmaker Claude Friese-Greene and great-grandson of photographer and inventor William Friese-Greene.

Career
He started his career as a tape-operator at Wessex Sound Studios in London in the mid 1970s before rapidly becoming an engineer, working with artists including Hawkwind and The Rumour.

Producer
Friese-Greene co-produced the second release of Thomas Dolby's The Golden Age of Wireless (1982), which included the "She Blinded Me with Science" single, and Blue Zoo's debut album Two by Two (1983). He produced and played keyboards on the Praying Mantis album Time Tells No Lies (1981). He produced a number of songs for the pop act Tight Fit, the single "The Lion Sleeps Tonight" in early 1982 (No. 1 for three weeks in the UK charts) and its follow-up "Fantasy Island" (No. 5), and he also produced and wrote most of the accompanying album. Later in 1982, he produced "Dragonfly", a single by the Nolans. He produced Lush's 1990 4AD Records EP Sweetness and Light.

Work with Talk Talk
Friese-Greene was brought into Talk Talk to assist in the remixing of It's My Life (1984). As a permanent supporting musician to the band, he produced, co-wrote, and played keyboards on four of Talk Talk's albums between 1984 and 1991: It's My Life, The Colour of Spring, Spirit of Eden, and Laughing Stock. He was only an occasional player on Talk Talk's live tours and did not wish to appear in the band's promotional photo sessions or music videos.

He produced The Great War of Words (1990) by Brian Kennedy. He also produced Catherine Wheel's Ferment and Wishville, and played keyboards on various releases by the band.

After Talk Talk
As Heligoland, Friese-Greene has released two EPs and two full-length albums. For Heligoland, he writes most of the music himself and plays most of the instruments.

His latest album, 10 Sketches for Piano Trio, was released under his own name.

In February 2010, he announced on his website that the recording of a new album had to be suspended due to severe tinnitus. A subsequent posting in December revealed, however, that work on another album was underway without the use of headphones.

Discography

Heligoland
Creosote & Tar (1997, EP)
Heligoland (2000)
Pitcher, Flask & Foxy Moxie (2006)
One Girl Among Many (2015, EP)

Solo
10 Sketches for Piano Trio (2009)
"I Would Change None for You" (single) (2015)
Melodic Apoptosis (2022)

With Talk Talk
It's My Life (1984)
The Colour of Spring (1986)
Spirit of Eden (1988)
Laughing Stock (1991)

As a producer (incomplete)
Shades in Bed by The Records (1979, co-produced)
Long Distance by Night (1980)
Touch by Touch (1980)
Under Influence by Zones (1979)
Time Tells No Lies by Praying Mantis (1981)
Ocean by Ocean (1981)
The Golden Age of Wireless by Thomas Dolby (1982, second release, co-produced)
Tight Fit by Tight Fit (1982)
 "Josephine (Too Many Secrets)" by Jon English (1982, single) from In Roads
"Dragonfly" by The Nolans (1982, single)
Talkback by Stiff Little Fingers (1982, single)
Two by Two by Blue Zoo (1983)
It's My Life by Talk Talk (1984)
The Colour of Spring by Talk Talk (1986)
 Cold Grey Eyes by Salvation Sunday (1988)
Spirit of Eden by Talk Talk (1988)
The Great War of Words by Brian Kennedy (1990)
Sweetness and Light by Lush (1990, EP)
Laughing Stock by Talk Talk (1991)
Ferment by Catherine Wheel (1992)
Broooch by Sidi Bou Said (1993)
Wishville by Catherine Wheel (2000)
Skeleton Hill by Firefly Burning (2015)
Breathe Shallow by Firefly Burning (2019)

References

External links
Official website

Living people
English record producers
English pop musicians
English keyboardists
English new wave musicians
Year of birth missing (living people)